Clash of the Gods may refer to:

 Clash of the Gods (TV series), a 2009 television series on the History channel
 Clash of the Gods (album), a 2012 album by Grave Digger